Middle Footscray railway station is located on the Sunbury line in Victoria, Australia. It serves the western Melbourne suburb of Footscray, and it opened on 10 December 1906.

In 1927, the station was moved about 160 metres west and reconstructed, to allow for the construction of the South Kensington – West Footscray goods line.

Two dual gauge goods tracks operate north of the station, linking the Port of Melbourne and other freight terminals to the rest of the state. Since 1962, those tracks have also formed part of the Melbourne – Sydney standard gauge line and, since 1995, have also formed part of the Melbourne – Adelaide standard gauge line. The Regional Rail Link lines operate to the south of the station.

Platforms and services

Middle Footscray has one island platform with two faces. It is serviced by Metro Trains' Sunbury line services.

Platform 1:
  all stations services to Flinders Street

Platform 2:
  all stations services to Watergardens and Sunbury

By late 2025, it is planned that trains on the Sunbury line will be through-routed with those on the Pakenham and Cranbourne lines, via the new Metro Tunnel.

Transport links

CDC Melbourne operates three routes via Middle Footscray station, under contract to Public Transport Victoria:
 : Laverton station – Footscray
 : Laverton station – Footscray
 : Laverton station – Footscray station

Kinetic Melbourne operates one route via Middle Footscray station, under contract to Public Transport Victoria:
 : Yarraville – Highpoint Shopping Centre

Transit Systems Victoria operates one route via Middle Footscray station, under contract to Public Transport Victoria:
  : Footscray – Newport station (Saturday and Sunday mornings only)

The bus stop is located on Buckley Street, about 100m from the station entrance on Victoria Street.

Gallery

References

External links
 
 Rail Geelong gallery
 Melway map at street-directory.com.au

Railway stations in Melbourne
Railway stations in Australia opened in 1906
Railway stations in the City of Maribyrnong